The Battle of Ayshal was fought on June 29, 1853, between the forces of Kassa Hailu and the forces of Ras Ali II, in Ayshal, in eastern Gojjam.  Kassa's forces won the battle.

The popularity of Kassa continued to grow as he successfully defeated several chiefs one after another, including Dejazmach Birru Goshu, Birru Aligaz and Belew. Birru Aligaz and Belew were defeated in the battle of Taqussa, that enraged Ras Ali. Finally, Ras Ali and Kassa fought the battle in Ayshal and Ras Ali fled to Yeju after losing the battle. According to traditional Ethiopian history, the battle of Ayshal marks the end of the Zemene Mesafint.

References

Battles involving Ethiopia
Battles of the Zemene Mesafint
1853 in Ethiopia
Conflicts in 1853
June 1853 events